The Lesmahagow Railway, south of Glasgow in Scotland, was developed by a company known as The Lesmahagow Branches (later known as The Lesmahagow Guarantee Company). It was not an independent company in the usual sense. It was a financially independent, self-contained unit within the framework of the Caledonian Railway. The shareholders and officers of both companies were mainly the same people. The line was  built largely to transport the vast amount coal being produced by the many mines in the area. Royal assent was given to build the line in 1847 but construction did not  commence till 1854. In 1856 the line was opened in stages. Later there was found to be a demand for passenger services which commenced in 1868. In 1923, with the grouping, the CR amalgamated with several other companies to form the London, Midland and Scottish Railway (LMS) which, following nationalisation in 1947, became part of British Railways.

Branches

Coalburn Branch

From Lesmahagow railway station to Bankend railway station.

Stonehouse Branch
Separates from the Coalburn branch at Dalserf Junction.

Blackwood Branch
Separates from the Coalburn branch at Southfield Junction.

Swinhill Branch
Built for Swinhill Colliery, the branch reaches Stonehouse Junction.

Little Gill Branch
Located north of Auchenheath railway station, it reaches Little Gill Colliery.

Construction

There were major difficulties building the line as, following  rain, the ground took up the appearance and consistency of black mud. The line was built over a vast coalfield. In between the coal were large deposits of various other valuable minerals. There were several landslips as the embankments were being built. Two large viaducts had to be constructed - one at Nethan and another near Hamilton. The former had to be re-constructed a few years following the opening as the heavy coal trains were causing considerable damage. It had been built to a very low budget and was too low. Consequently, the approaches on both sides were very steep. In a costly rebuild iron piers were inserted between the existing stone ones and the rail level was raised by 19½ feet permitting an easing of the approach gradients. Even then the Nethan viaduct was a fragile structure and one of the highest in Scotland. A 20 m.p.h. speed limit was imposed on it. It was demolished in 1955. Lesmahgow station was high above and well east of the town. In July 1905 a roughly parallel line was built with a station closer to the centre of the town and the earlier station was renamed Brocketsbrae. Trains ceased to call at the latter station in 1951.

Running

From the start the line was extremely busy with mineral traffic. At one stage eight engines were required to work the line and, owing to the weight of the coal being transported, had to be the most powerful available. A large quantity cannel coal was transported. This was a highly volatile mineral much in demand by the gas industry. Apart from coal there were several other minerals found in the area where transportation by rail was the preferred option. These included ironstone, limestone and sandstone. When passenger trains were introduced they were widely used by people travelling to and from work.

Closure

Gradually the mines became exhausted and were closed. Passengers tended to prefer road transport. By the mid-1960s, as part of the Beeching cuts, it was declared uneconomic and shut over its entire length and the tracks lifted.

References

External links
Rails to Coalburn

Caledonian Railway
Closed railway lines in Scotland
Standard gauge railways in Scotland
Railway lines opened in 1856
Railway companies established in 1847
Railway companies disestablished in 1923
1847 establishments in Scotland
British companies established in 1847
1923 disestablishments in Scotland
British companies disestablished in 1923